Judith Rachel Holt (born 15 August 1960 in Farnworth, Lancashire) is a British television actress, best known for her role as Elaine Fishwick in At Home with the Braithwaites and her role as Lesley Kershaw in Coronation Street. Holt was trained at the Manchester Polytechnic's School of Theatre.

Filmography

External links 

1960 births
British soap opera actresses
British television actresses
Actresses from Lancashire
Living people
Alumni of Manchester Metropolitan University
Actresses from Manchester
Actors from Bolton
People from Farnworth
20th-century British actresses
21st-century British actresses
20th-century English women
20th-century English people
21st-century English women
21st-century English people